Elias Toufexis is a Canadian actor. He has played characters on television and in video games, mostly in science fiction and fantasy genres.

Career

Acting

Toufexis acted in small television roles at first, eventually playing Morton in the made-for-television film The Five People You Meet in Heaven, based on a book by Mitch Albom.

He then played Webber in an episode of Supernatural. Toufexis followed this with his second appearance on Smallville as Bronson, a character who can travel between radio frequencies and kidnaps Lex Luthor. His third character on Smallville was Emil Lasalle, a.k.a. Warp, a member of the Suicide Squad from DC Comics.

He has since played the "villain of the week" on shows like Criminal Minds, The Listener, Painkiller Jane, Flashpoint, Flash Gordon, Stargate Atlantis, Lost Girl, and Houdini & Doyle.

He has also appeared on The Expanse, where he plays two characters. In season one, he plays the role of Kenzo Gabriel, a spy who joins the crew of the Rocinante. In season two, he portrays, via performance capture, the role of the hybrid creature or "The Seventh Man".

In 2022, Toufexis joined the cast of the fifth season of Star Trek Discovery as the recurring character L'ak.

Voice and motion capture
Toufexis began his video game voice-over and performance-capture career in 2006 with Need for Speed: Carbon. Two of his most popular characters are Andriy Kobin and Adam Jensen. Kobin is one of the villains in Tom Clancy's Splinter Cell: Conviction. He reprised the role, this time as a main supporting character in Tom Clancy's Splinter Cell: Blacklist. Adam Jensen is the main character in Deus Ex: Human Revolution; Toufexis' wife, Michelle Boback, had a supporting role in this game as scientist Megan Reed. Toufexis has publicly stated that he is a fan of the Deus Ex series, particularly the one released in 2000. Toufexis was cast to play the protagonist of Far Cry 3, Jason Brody. However, he was replaced by another voice actor, Gianpaolo Venuta, after he worked on the role for two years, as the publisher of the game did not want players to confuse Brody with Jensen. He played the lead role in Far Cry Primal, a spin-off of the Far Cry series. Toufexis reprised his role as Jensen in Deus Ex: Mankind Divided, a sequel to Human Revolution.
On February 28, 2018, Toufexis announced on Twitter that he was voicing a character in the new BattleTech video game by Harebrained Schemes, stating that he had sought out a role and was accepted. That character was later revealed to be Commodore Samuel Ostergaard of the Taurian Concordat Navy, a primary antagonist in the game.

Filmography

Film

Television

Video games

References

External links
 
 

Living people
Canadian male film actors
Canadian male voice actors
Canadian male stage actors
Canadian male television actors
Canadian people of Greek descent
Male actors from Montreal
20th-century Canadian male actors
Year of birth missing (living people)
Place of birth missing (living people)